The 2022 Cork Junior A Football Championship was the 124th staging of the Cork Junior A Football Championship since its establishment by the Cork County Board in 1895. The championship ran from 15 October to 13 November 2022.

The final was played on 13 November 2022 at Páirc Uí Chaoimh in Cork, between Kilmurry and Cobh, in what was their fiurst ever meeting in the final. Kilmurry won the match by 1-12 to 0-08 to claim their fifth championship title overall and a first title in 36 years.

Buttevant's Mark Lenehan was the championship's top scorer with 2-08.

Qualification

Fixtures and results

Bracket

Quarter-finals

Semi-finals

Final

Championship Statistics

Top scorers

Overall

In a single game

References

External link 

 Cork GAA website

2022 in Irish sport
Cork Junior A Football Championship